The Federation of Democrats was a South African political party formed by Louis Green, after he crossed the floor from the African Christian Democratic Party, in September 2005.

External links
Federation of Democrats Official Site

2005 establishments in South Africa
African National Congress breakaway groups
Defunct political parties in South Africa
Political parties in South Africa created by floor crossing
Political parties with year of disestablishment missing